The 2011–12 Loyola Marymount Lions men's basketball team represents Loyola Marymount University in the 2011–12 college basketball season. This is head coach Max Good's fourth season at Loyola Marymount. The Lions play their home games at the Gersten Pavilion and are members of the West Coast Conference. The Lions have accepted an invitation to participate in the 2012 CollegeInsider.com Tournament.

Roster

Schedule and results
Source

|-
!colspan=9| Exhibition

|-
!colspan=9| Regular Season

|-
!colspan=9| 2012 West Coast Conference men's basketball tournament

|-
!colspan=9| 2012 CollegeInsider.com Postseason Tournament

References

Loyola Marymount Lions men's basketball seasons
Loyola Marymount
Loyola Marymount